Anisynta cynone, the mottled grass-skipper or cynone skipper, is a species of butterfly of the family Hesperiidae. It is found in the Australian states of New South Wales, Victoria and South Australia.

The wingspan is about 20 mm.

The larvae feed on Poa species, such as Poa sieberiana, and Brachypodium distachyon, Cynodon dactylon, Austrostipa scabra and Oryzopsis miliacea.

Subspecies
Anisynta cynone cynone
Anisynta cynone gunneda
Anisynta cynone gracilis
Anisynta cynone grisea

External links
 Australian Caterpillars

Trapezitinae
Butterflies described in 1874
Butterflies of Australia
Taxa named by William Chapman Hewitson